The Complete In a Silent Way Sessions is a three-disc box set by trumpeter Miles Davis released by Legacy Records, (Mosaic Records in conjunction with Legacy released the 5 LP set) featuring recordings from the sessions that would produce his 1969 album In a Silent Way as well as transitional pieces from the era. Besides two tracks previously released on the 1968 album Filles de Kilimanjaro, the set also includes material for Columbia outtake compilations Water Babies, Circle in the Round, and Directions. The  box set features previously unreleased music, mostly from the In a Silent Way sessions proper. As well as the CDs, it includes essays by Michael Cuscuna and Bob Belden and details of the recording sessions. It is number five in the Legacy series of Miles Davis' Complete Sessions box sets.

It includes several previously unreleased tracks on CD, namely "Splashdown", "The Ghetto Walk" and "Early Minor", plus a longer, much different version of "Shhh/Peaceful" and two "In a Silent Way" alternate takes.

Track listing 
All tracks composed by Miles Davis, except where noted.

Personnel

Musicians 
 Miles Davis – trumpet
 Wayne Shorter – tenor saxophone (Disc 1: All), soprano saxophone
 John McLaughlin – electric guitar (Disc 2: Tracks 4-7; Disc 3: All)
 Chick Corea – electric piano
 Herbie Hancock – electric piano
 Joe Zawinul – organ (Disc 2; Disc 3)
 Dave Holland – double bass
 Tony Williams – drums
 Jack DeJohnette – drums (Disc 2: Tracks 1-3)
 Joe Chambers – drums (Disc 3: Tracks 1 and 2)

Charts

References

Miles Davis compilation albums
2001 compilation albums
Columbia Records compilation albums
Albums recorded at CBS 30th Street Studio